Raigama Bandara also known as Pararajasinghe , or Pararaja Singha, was a ruler of Raigama (r. 1521) in modern-day Sri Lanka.  He was the son of Vijayabahu VII (1521) and brother of Mayadunne and Buvanekabahu VI. When Kingdom of Kotte was divided due to the incident known as "Wijayaba Kollaya", which resulted in the assassination of king Vijayabahu, Pararajasinghe became the ruler of Raigama.

Raigam Bandara was known as a good ruler who upheld the economy of the Raigama. However, after a battle with the Kingdom of Kotte the family of Raigam Bandara had fled to Matara as a result of miscommunication. The fleeing of the family was followed by the downfall of the ruler himself. The only descendants of the king still live bearing the name of "Mohotti" in Matara and in North Central province.

After Raigama Bandara's death in 1538, his brother Mayadunne, ruler of Sitawaka, annexed the kingdom of Raigam.

References

Crisis of the Sixteenth Century
People of the Kingdom of Kotte